Ade  is an African surname.  When found in Western Africa, it is usually accented. Ade is also a surname used by Banjara in India Refer Banjara Rajputs. 

Ade may refer to people named:
 Ebiet G. Ade, Indonesian singer
 George Ade, American writer
 King Sunny Adé, Nigerian musician
 MC ADE, American musician

References